Arohaki Lagoon (formerly Arahaki Lagoon) is a small ephemeral lagoon located in the Whakatāne District of the North Island, New Zealand. It is within the Whirinaki Te Pua-a-Tāne Conservation Park, south and can be accessed via a  walking track.

Etymology
The Ngāti Whare Claims Settlement Act 2012 changed the name of the lagoon from Arahaki to Arohaki. According to the Ngāti Whare Deed of Settlement, the name is taken from a description of "the taking off of the birds, one by one, circling around".

Significance to Māori
Arohaki Lagoon holds significance for the local iwi, Ngāti Whare.

Fauna and flora

Arohaki Lagoon contains kōkopu (native galaxiid fish), and serves as a sanctuary and breeding ground for various bird species. Frogs can also be found at the lagoon.

The lagoon contains a large population of water brome (Amphibromus fluitans), a threatened species of native grass. Kahikatea trees line the perimeter of Arohaki Lagoon.

References

Lakes of the Bay of Plenty Region